Trachionus is a genus of braconid wasps in the family Braconidae. There are about 13 described species in Trachionus.

Species
These 13 species belong to the genus Trachionus:

 Trachionus agromyzae (Rohwer, 1914) c g
 Trachionus belfragei (Ashmead, 1889) c g
 Trachionus hians (Nees, 1816) c g
 Trachionus kotenkoi (Perepechayenko, 1997) c g
 Trachionus lucidus (Rohwer, 1914) c g
 Trachionus mandibularis (Nees, 1816) c g
 Trachionus microcephalus (Tobias, 1970) c g
 Trachionus nigricornis (Rohwer, 1914) c g
 Trachionus pappi (Zaykov, 1982) c g
 Trachionus portlandicus (Rohwer, 1914) c g
 Trachionus ringens (Haliday, 1839) c g
 Trachionus rugosus (Zaykov, 1982) c g
 Trachionus sericeus (Provancher, 1888) c g

Data sources: i = ITIS, c = Catalogue of Life, g = GBIF, b = Bugguide.net

References

Further reading

External links

 

Parasitic wasps